John Christian Curwen, born John Christian (12 July 1756 – 11 December 1828) was an English Member of Parliament and High Sheriff.

Early life
He was born on 12 July 1756.  He was the eldest surviving son of John Christian of Ewanrigg, Cumberland (now Cumbria) and Jane (née Curwen) Christian, the daughter of Eldred Curwen of Workington Hall, Cumberland.

He was educated at Peterhouse, Cambridge in 1773 before going on the Grand Tour between 1779 and 1782.

Career
He succeeded his father in 1767 and served as High Sheriff of Cumberland from 1784 to 1785, although he twice refused a peerage.

He was elected Member of Parliament (MP) for Carlisle for 1786 to 1790 and again for 1791 to 1812 and for 1816 to 1820. He was then elected to represent the county seat of Cumberland. He was a member of the Whig party and an active campaigner in Parliament, and known as something of a radical, having approved of the French Revolution.

Personal life

He married twice. His first marriage was on 10 September 1775 to Margaret Taubman (d. 1778), the daughter of John Taubman, Speaker of the House of Keys, of Castletown, Isle of Man, with whom he had a son:

 John Christian (1776–1852), who inherited Ewanrigg Hall and married Susanna Allen, daughter of Lewis Robert Allen of Dalston.

His second marriage was on 5 October 1782 to his cousin Isabella Curwen, the daughter and heiress of Henry Curwen of Workington.  On 6 March 1790, he took the name of Curwen after inheriting Workington Hall. Workington Hall, now ruined after a wartime fire, is a Grade I listed building.  Together, John and Isabella were the parents of five sons and three daughters, including:

 Henry Curwen (1783–1861), who inherited Workington Hall and married Jane Stanley.

He died on 11 December 1828 in financial difficulties because of increased costs and reduced profits from his coal mines and was buried in an unmarked grave in Workington. At his death, he owed £118,334 and only £16,579 was owed to him.

References

External links
 CURWEN (formerly CHRISTIAN), John Christian (1756-1828), of Ewanrigg and Workington Hall, Cumb. at the History of Parliament Online.
 Portrait of Curwen by John James Halls and the Manx Museum.
 Curwen, John Christian (1756-1828) MP, Papers at The National Archives.

1756 births
1828 deaths
People from Maryport
Alumni of Peterhouse, Cambridge
High Sheriffs of Cumberland
Members of the Parliament of Great Britain for English constituencies
British MPs 1784–1790
British MPs 1790–1796
British MPs 1796–1800
Members of the Parliament of the United Kingdom for English constituencies
UK MPs 1801–1802
UK MPs 1802–1806
UK MPs 1806–1807
UK MPs 1807–1812
UK MPs 1812–1818
UK MPs 1818–1820
UK MPs 1820–1826
UK MPs 1826–1830
Members of the Parliament of Great Britain for Carlisle
Members of the Parliament of the United Kingdom for Carlisle
John